Meyer Morton, born Myer Isakovitz (November 20, 1889 – February 8, 1948) was an American football player and official and lawyer from Chicago, Illinois.

Early years
Morton was born in November 1889 in Chicago.  His birth name was Myer Isakovitz.  His parents, Martin "Max" Morton and Elizabeth "Bessie" (Schreier)  Morton, were Russian Jews, his parents immigrating between 1879 and 1882.  They became naturalized U.S. citizens in 1890.

At the time of the 1900 United States Census, the family's last name was recorded as "Isacovitz."  At the time of the 1910 United States Census, the family had changed its name to Morton and was living in Troy, New York.  The father was employed as a salesman at a dry goods store.

University of Michigan
Morton enrolled at the University of Michigan and received a law degree as part of the Class of 1912.  While attending Michigan, he played on the freshman baseball and track teams.  He was also a reserve player on the undefeated 1910 Michigan Wolverines football team as a sophomore and a member of the class football team as a junior.

Legal and officiating career
After graduating from Michigan, Morton returned to Chicago and worked as a lawyer there from 1915 to 1948.  At the time of World War I, Morton was single, living in Chicago and working as a self-employed lawyer.  He was serving as a private in the National Guard, Illinois - 1st Cavalry.

Morton also worked on Saturdays as a game official for the Big Ten Conference for 23 years from the 1920s to the 1940s.  After serving as the head linesman a game between Notre Dame and Northwestern in October 1926, Morton was criticized by Knute Rockne who felt that Morton had over-penalized the Fighting Irish team.  Rockne recalled it was "the only time in my life I ever got sore at an official" and felt it was unfair that Michigan coach Fielding H. Yost was picking game officials for Notre Dame.  In his history of the Michigan - Notre Dame rivalry, John Kryk wrote:

Meyer Morton, as Rockne well knew, was a Conference man.  Worse, a Michigan man.  Still worse, a Yost man.  Indeed, Morton was a prominent member of the University of Michigan Club of Chicago, and his correspondence with Yost and others dot the Michigan files of the 1920s and 1930s.

Later years and death
At the time of World War II, Morton was living in Chicago and working for the Chicago Flexible Shaft Co., a manufacturer of electrical appliances that later became known as Sunbeam Products.

Morton died in 1948 in Chicago.

Meyer Morton Award
During his lifetime, Morton was one of the leading members of the "M" Club of Chicago.  In 1925, the club began a tradition of giving an award each year to the Michigan football player who showed "the greatest development and most promise as a result of the annual spring practice."  For many years, Morton traveled from Chicago to present the award in Ann Arbor.  Beginning in 1948, after Morton's death, the annual award was renamed the Meyer Morton Award.

The award has been presented to many of the legends in Michigan football history, including Gerald R. Ford (1932), Ron Kramer (1954), Jim Harbaugh (1984), and Desmond Howard (1991). A complete list of the past winners is set forth below.

References

1889 births
1948 deaths
Michigan Wolverines football players
Players of American football from Chicago
University of Michigan Law School alumni